Paul Delaney (born 27 November 1966) is an Irish retired hurler. His league and championship career with the Tipperary senior team spanned eleven seasons from 1986 to 1997.

Delaney first appeared for the Roscrea club at juvenile and underage levels, before eventually joining the club's senior team, however, he ended his career without a county championship medal.

Delaney made his debut on the inter-county scene when he was selected for the Tipperary minor team in 1984. He enjoyed one unsuccessful championship seasons with the minor team before subsequently joining the under-21 team with whom he won an All-Ireland medal with in 1985. Delaney made his senior debut during the 1986-87 league. The highlight of his eleven year senior career came in 1991 when he won his sole All-Ireland medal. Delaney also won five Munster medals and one National League medal.

After being chosen on the Munster inter-provincial team for the first time in 1987, Ryan was an automatic choice on the starting fifteen for a number of years. During that time he won one Railway Cup medal.

He is a keen Manchester United supporter and has travelled to Old Trafford on many occasions.

Paul also considers himself a golfer and plays at his local club in Roscrea.

Honours

Tipperary
All-Ireland Senior Hurling Championship (2): All-Ireland Senior Hurling Championship 1989,1991.
Munster Senior Hurling Championship (5): 1987, 1988, 1989, 1991, 1993
National Hurling League (1): 1987-88
All-Ireland Under-21 Hurling Championship (1): 1985
Munster Under-21 Hurling Championship (1): 1985

Munster
Railway Cup (1): 1992

References

1966 births
Living people
Roscrea hurlers
Tipperary inter-county hurlers
Munster inter-provincial hurlers
All-Ireland Senior Hurling Championship winners